William Stanley Russell Thomas (1896 – 21 March 1957) was a physician, barrister and Welsh Liberal politician who served as a Liberal National Member of Parliament.

Education
Educated at Brecon Grammar School, Christ College, Brecon, and Queens' College, Cambridge.

Physician
He qualified as a physician and surgeon at Guy's Hospital and was Treasurer's gold medallist in medicine.

Barrister
He was called to the Bar by Lincoln's Inn in 1930.

Politician

Ilford

He was Liberal candidate for Ilford in the 1931 election. It was a promising seat which the Liberals had nearly gained from the Conservatives in 1929. At the 1931 elections, the Liberal party was split into three groups and Thomas remained with the official Liberals under Sir Herbert Samuel, in support of the National Government. He finished third in Ilford, just behind the Labour candidate. 
He remained loyal to the official Liberal party when it left the National government in 1932.

Aberdeenshire Central
Despite his poor showing at Ilford in 1931, for the 1935 election he was selected as Liberal candidate in the promising constituency of Aberdeenshire Central where the Liberal in 1931 finished a close second behind the Conservative in a two-party contest. However, in 1935, the Labour party intervened and in a three-way contest Thomas finished third, again just behind Labour.

Ross & Cromarty
His next attempt to enter parliament was also in Scotland at the 1936 Ross and Cromarty by-election. In 1935, the Liberal National candidate was re-elected unopposed. When the by-election came around, a minority section of the local Liberal Association wanted a Liberal to stand and were unhappy when the majority decided to support a National Labour candidate. The Scottish Liberal Federation persuaded Thomas to stand as a Liberal candidate. However, the result was a disaster for Thomas as he finished fourth. 

Following this disappointment, Thomas decided to switch his support from the official Liberal party to the Liberal National party.

Southampton
His connection with the Liberal Nationals was far more rewarding when he was chosen as the National government's candidate for the 1940 by-election in Southampton. By then, a war time electoral truce between the main political parties was in operation, so Thomas was returned unopposed. 
At the 1945 General election, Thomas sought re-election as a Liberal National candidate in support of Winston Churchill. Southampton was a dual member seat and he ran in tandem with a Conservative against two Labour candidates and a Liberal. However, he lost his seat and finished fourth.

Thomas contested Middlesbrough East in the 1950 general election, however, this time not as a Liberal National but as an official Liberal candidate. He came third with 10% of the vote.

Brecon & Radnor
Despite his Welsh heritage, none of his previous electoral challenges was in his native Wales. However he was selected as Liberal candidate for Brecon & Radnor for the 1955 General election. Having been raised in Brecon, he might have had hopes of winning. However, the Liberals had not contested the seat in 1951 and in 1950, their candidate finished a poor third. The 1955 elections represented the lowest point in the fortunes of the Liberal party and Thomas was to finish third once again. 

This was to be his electoral swansong.

References

Times Guide House of Commons 1955

External links 
 

1896 births
1957 deaths
Liberal Party (UK) MPs for English constituencies
Members of the Parliament of the United Kingdom for Southampton
UK MPs 1935–1945
People educated at Brecon Grammar School
National Liberal Party (UK, 1931) politicians
Alumni of Queens' College, Cambridge